Axel Frederik Preben Schmidt (30 April 1939 – 10 June 2018) was a Brazilian sailor from Rio de Janeiro who competed in the Summer Olympic Games, the Pan American Games, the Snipe World Championships, the Star World Championships and the Lightning World Championships.

He is the son of Preben Tage Axel Schmidt (born in 1898 in Frederiksberg, Denmark) and Helene Margrete Jelinski (born in Lyck, East Prussia) and brother of Ingrid, Margrete and Erik Schmidt, also competitive Brazilian sailors. Ingrid is the mother of Torben Grael and Lars Grael.

He and his twin brother Erik were known as "the sea twins" after winning 3 Snipe Worlds in a row (1961, 1963 and 1965). They also won the 1959 Pan American Games and finished 2nd in the 1963 Pan American Games in Lightning and third in the 1961 Lightning World Championships. In the Star class, they were 9th at the 1967 Star World Championships, and Axel was 22nd at the 1980 Star World Championships with Luiz Amaro as a crew.

Pan American Games
Axel Schmidt sailed at 2 different Pan American Games:
 1st place in Lightning at Chicago 1959.
 2nd place in Lightning at São Paulo 1963.

Olympic Games
Axel Schmidt sailed at 2 different Olympic Games:
 7th place in Star at Acapulco 1968.
 6th place in Soling at Munich 1972.

References

1939 births
2018 deaths
Sportspeople from Rio de Janeiro (city)
Brazilian male sailors (sport)
Olympic sailors of Brazil
Sailors at the 1968 Summer Olympics – Star
Sailors at the 1972 Summer Olympics – Soling
Pan American Games gold medalists for Brazil
Pan American Games silver medalists for Brazil
Sailors at the 1959 Pan American Games
Sailors at the 1963 Pan American Games
Snipe class world champions
Twin sportspeople
Brazilian twins
Brazilian people of Danish descent
Brazilian people of German descent
Pan American Games medalists in sailing
World champions in sailing for Brazil
Medalists at the 1959 Pan American Games
Medalists at the 1963 Pan American Games